Jakarta Selatan Football Club or Jaksel FC (formerly known as PSJS South Jakarta) is an Indonesian football club based in South Jakarta, Jakarta. They currently competes in Liga 3.

References

External links
Liga-Indonesia.co.id
 

 
Football clubs in Jakarta
Football clubs in Indonesia
Association football clubs established in 1975
1975 establishments in Indonesia